Tirso González de Santalla (18 January 1624 – 27 October 1705) was a Spanish theologian who was elected, in 1687, the thirteenth Superior General of the Society of Jesus.

Formation and Studies
Santalla was born in Arganza, Spain.  He did his Humanities and Letters at Villafranca (Leόn), and a year of Philosophy at Oviedo before he entered the Society of Jesus in 1643. Studies of Philosophy at Valladolid (1645–47) and Theology at the University of Salamanca (1647–51) with a further two years of specialization. A brilliant debater he was trained to be professor of philosophy and theology, which he did at Santiago (Philosophy, 1653–55) and Valladolid and Salamanca (Theology, 1656–65), and again from 1676 to 1687, the intervening years having been devoted to preaching.

Early career
As an ardent adversary of probabilism González had frequently asked his superiors to have some Jesuit write against the doctrine. He himself had composed a work in which he defended probabiliorism, assigning, however, an exaggerated importance to the subjective estimation of the degree of probability. The general revisors of the Society unanimously rendered an unfavorable opinion on the work, and accordingly, in 1674, the Superior General Giovanni Paolo Oliva refused permission for its publication. González received encouragement from Pope Innocent XI and by his order the Holy Office issued a decree, in 1680, ordering the superiors of the Society to allow their subjects to defend probabiliorism, a permission that had never been denied.

Superior General
When about to set out for Africa to convert the Muslims in 1687, he was sent as an elector to the thirteenth general congregation, by which he was elected Superior General (6 July 1687). Concerned that most Jesuits were in favour of probabilism, the Pope made it clear that González, a rare probabiliorist in the Society, was his candidate. As General of the Society, González felt himself obliged to fight probabilism among his subjects. In 1691, he had printed a modified edition of his former work, but, owing to the efforts of his assistants, this book was never published. Pope Innocent XII ordered a new examination of it to be made, and with many corrections it finally appeared in 1694, under the title Fundamentum Theologiae moralis id est, tractatus theologicus de recto usu opinionum probabilium.  He died, aged 81, in Rome.

Works
We also have from the pen of González some apologetic works: Selectarum disputationum tomi quattuor (1680) in which are found chapters against the Thomists, Jansenists, and some doctors of Louvain; treatises on the Immaculate Conception, and on papal infallibility. This last, directed against the Declaration of the Clergy of France of 1682, and printed by the order of Innocent XI, was afterwards suppressed by Alexander VIII, who feared new difficulties with the French court. The work appeared, in résumé only, in 1691.

References
 HOANG MANH-HIEN, J., Th. Gonzalez et le probabilisme, Cholon, 1959;
 EMANUELE COLOMBO, Convertire i musulmani. L'esperienza di un gesuita spagnolo del Seicento, Milano, 2007.
 EMANUELE COLOMBO, “In virtù dell’obbedienza. Tirso González de Santalla (1624-1705) missionario, teologo, generale” in Avventure dell’obbedienza nella Compagnia di Gesù. Teorie e prassi fra XVI e XIX secolo, (eds.) Claudio Ferlan and Fernanda, (Il Mulino: Bologna 2012),  97-137.  
 EMANUELE COLOMBO, "“Even among Turks. Tirso González de Santalla (1624-1705) and Islam,” Studies on Jesuit Spirituality, 44/3 (2012). 
UGO TARABORRELLI, Apologia dell’infallibilità papale e censura dei costumi: i manoscritti di Tirso González de Santalla (1624-1705) in APUG
 Jean-Pascal Gay, Jesuit Civil Wars. Theology, Politics and Government under Tirso González (1687-1705), Farnham & Burlington, 2012.

External links
 Tirso González de Santalla in the Historical Archives of the Pontifical Gregorian University

1624 births
1705 deaths
People from El Bierzo
Superiors General of the Society of Jesus
17th-century Spanish Jesuits
University of Salamanca alumni
Academic staff of the University of Salamanca
17th-century Spanish Roman Catholic theologians